CSICon or CSIConference is an annual skeptical conference typically held in the United States. CSICon is hosted by the Committee for Skeptical Inquiry (CSI), which is a program of the Center for Inquiry (CFI). CSI publishes the magazine Skeptical Inquirer.

History

1983–2005: CSICOP conferences 

CSICon's current format stems from 2011, but similar conferences by CSI (until 2006 known as CSICOP, the Committee for the Scientific Investigation of Claims of the Paranormal) go back as far as 1983, when the first was held at the State University of New York at Buffalo (SUNY). The second international CSICOP conference, themed "Paranormal Beliefs: Scientific Facts and Fictions", was held at Stanford University in 1984. The third, the first European CSICOP conference, was held at University College London in Britain, themed "Investigation and Belief".

Throughout the 1980s, the European readership of the Skeptical Inquirer was increasing, while CSICOP members James Randi and Paul Kurtz were visiting several European countries to help found national skeptical organizations with their own magazines. In 1989, the second European CSICOP conference occurred in Bad Tölz, Germany, co-organized by the GWUP and also known as the 1st European Skeptics Congress. It was followed by the formation of the European Council of Skeptical Organisations in 1994, that would henceforth host international skeptical conferences in Europe.

Subsequent CSICOP conferences were always held inside the United States. These included the First World Skeptics Congress at SUNY Buffalo (1996), "That’s Entertainment! Hollywood, the Media, and the Supernatural" with the Council for Media Integrity in Los Angeles (1998), "Science Meets 'Alternative Medicine'" in Philadelphia (1999) and others.

2005–2011: hiatus 
Around 2005, the CSICOP conferences that were on average held every year and a half, usually at a major American university in conjunction with the relevant faculties such as physics, psychology and philosophy, went into a seven-year hiatus. According to Kendrick Frazier, the organization struggled with its leadership, focus and future perspective, prompting amongst other things the 2006 renaming from CSICOP to CSI, the Committee for Skeptical Inquiry. In the meantime, the annual skeptical conference in Las Vegas, The Amaz!ng Meeting run by the James Randi Educational Foundation (JREF), started to fill the gap and grew larger every year.

2011–present: CSICon

2011
When CSI stabilized in 2011, it held its first newly styled CSICon in New Orleans, Louisiana. At this first CSICon, Planetary Society president Bill Nye was presented with the "In Praise of Reason" Award for his efforts in science communication with shows such as "Bill Nye the Science Guy" and later series and lectures. Bill Nye is a frequent speaker at the conference, with speaking slots in 2011 and 2013. He also attended the conference in a non speaker role in 2018.

2012
CSICon 2 took place in Nashville, Tennessee, in October 2012.

2013
In October 2013, CSICon 3 was held as part of a larger CFI conference, including the Council for Secular Humanism (CSH), called the CFI Summit in Tacoma, Washington. This combined congress was an experiment, as some people like Ray Hyman and Daniel Loxton feared or argued the goals and focus of skepticism and humanism differed too much from each other to be discussed at a single conference.

On the other hand, Ronald A. Lindsay and Eddie Tabash defended the decision of a joint conference, and Susan Gerbic wrote afterwards she was "completely impressed" by how well the two camps overlapped (citing the creation–evolution controversy as the most important common ground), and "have to work together". In June 2015, again a joint CFI conference was organized under the banner "Reason for Change", with almost 500 people attending. Frazier opined that "[s]cientific skepticism and secularism/humanism blended fairly seamlessly" in Amherst, New York, the headquarters of CFI.

2016
After the last installment of The Amaz!ng Meeting in 2015, Las Vegas was chosen as the location for CSICon 2016 to fill the void.

There are active efforts to bring more students to CSICon, such as by Oregonians for Science and Reason (O4SR) which in 2016  and 2017  gave three scholarships that included conference fees, travel, hotel and food costs.

2017

At The Amaz!ng Meeting in 2011 (TAM 9) the Independent Investigations Group (IIG) organised a tribute to James Randi. The group gathered together with other attendees, put on fake white beards, and posed for a large group photo with Randi. At CSICon 2017, in absence of Randi, the IIG organised another group photo with leftover beards from the 2011 photo. After Randi was sent the photo, he replied, "I’m always very touched by any such expression. This is certainly no exception. You have my sincere gratitude. I suspect, however that a couple of those beards were fake. But I’m in a forgiving mood at the moment. I’m frankly very touched. I’ll see you at the next CSICon. Thank you all."

2018
Hundreds of new attendees to CSICon from the 650 person audience. CEO Robyn Blumner "There were impactful and thoughtful talks but also plenty of humor". According to Barry Karr the highlight for him was watching James Randi in conversation with Ray Hyman, James Alcock and Ken Frazier "discussing the founding of CSICOP (now CSI) and the dawning of the skeptic's movement. I am not sure how you can top a line-up like the one we had,... we certainly going to try next year!"

One Skeptical Inquirer article covering the 2018 conference profiled volunteer Scott Romanowski, who also volunteered at TAM, while another noted a large number of first-time attendees, and included interviews with several of these people from around the world to gain perspective on what they experienced.

2019
For the 2019 conference an effort was made to lower barriers for younger people to experience CSICon to encourage skeptical inquiry amongst a demographic largely absent from skeptical conferences. Susan Gerbic, Mark Edward, Kenny Biddle, John Anglin, Ron Lee and Stuart Vyse visited the Coral Academy of Science to talk to students shortly before and during the conference. The Skeptic community rallied around the cause and more than $4,000 was donated which paid for 16 students and 2 teachers to attend.

2020

The cancellation of the conference in 2020 due to the COVID-19 pandemic led to an online series of lectures entitled Skeptical Inquirer Presents. These sessions included presentations by well known figures in the skeptical community and opportunities for viewers to ask questions.

Conference details

Sunday Morning Papers Sessions 
One part of TAM that was carried over directly to CSICon is the Sunday Morning Papers Sessions. As described by Ray Hall, who has been in charge of vetting the Sunday Papers since TAM2 in 2002 and continued in that role for CSICon 2016, "The Sunday Papers are an opportunity for anyone with specific expertise to lend their skills to the [skeptical] movement . . . Proposals that make it to the stage have some or all of these characteristics: they are well researched (with citations), introduce new data and analysis, discuss successes in media outreach, and the speaker’s credentials are well matched to the content of the proposal." As Jay Diamond described them, "The Sunday Papers are 'best of' the skeptical community. Grassroots skeptics get fifteen minutes to discuss their passion, so they are concise and clear." Speakers are given a strict time limit of 15 minutes. According to Diamond, " It’s much easier to do an hour-long talk than fifteen minutes. For the short talk, you need to be very well rehearsed."

Skeptical Inquirer columnist Rob Palmer wrote an article titled, "So, You Want To Speak At CSICon?" which describes his experience of applying for and being accepted as a speaker for the 2018 Sunday Morning Papers Session. The article is aimed at those who are "considering submitting a proposal for the chance to address the conference – or are even just curious as to what the application experience is like."

In 2016, the wide-ranging topics included Creationist attacks on genetic algorithms, Rh-negative blood types, Homeopathy, concussions in American football, teaching critical thinking in college, and chemtrails.

In 2017, the Sunday Papers presentations included teaching people to recognize pseudoscience, the history of phrenology and parallels to the current misuse of functional MRI, the influence of prayer on sports outcomes, the belief in the paranormal among university students, and a review of aberrant treatments promoted on naturopath websites.

In 2018, the Sunday Papers presentations included speakers from the US, Brazil, India, and Denmark:
 Politicization of Science: CAMs in the Brazilian Public Healthcare System, by Natália Pasternak Taschner
 Our Fight to Bring in the Anti-black Magic Law in India, by Shantanu Abhyankar
 Patented Woo: Why does the Patent Office issue patents on homeopathic “cures" and other pseudoscience?, by Rick McLeod
 Pseudoscience Ruins Adolescence: Myths About Sex, Drugs, and Self-Control, by Stephen Hupp
 Guerrilla Skepticism on Wikipedia: Your Pathway to Skeptical Activism, by Rob Palmer
 The Harrit Syndrome: A New Explanation of Why and How People Become Evangelical Conspiracy Theorists, by Steen Svanholm & Claus Flodin Larsen

The 2019 Sunday Papers session consisted of five presentations, including two given by speakers from 2018 and one from the session moderator, Ray Hall:
 From Boob Tube to Woo Tube: A Method for Examining Science and Pseudoscience in Video Social Media, by Jessica E. Tuttle
 Belief in Psychics: What’s the Harm?, by Rob Palmer
 Brazilians Love and Support Science! Or is it Pseudoscience?, by Natália Pasternak Taschner
 The False Experts Among Us: Why Some (But Not All) Novices Exhibit the Dunning–Kruger Effect, by Kathleen Dyer
 Promoting Science on Social Media: Is the Public Willing to Believe Physics is Fun?, by Ray Hall

The 2022 Sunday Papers session conisited of six presentations, including one given by a speaker from 2018 and 2019.

 Weird Stuff: Using the Supernatural to Teach Critical Thinking by Eddy White, PhD
 Fostering Critical and Scientific Thinking Through a Community of Inquiry by Guilherme Brambatti Guzzo
  Analytical Skepticism in the Classroom by Michela Marinelli, PhD
 Richard Saunders (skeptic)#Great Australian Psychic Prediction Project|The Great Australian Psychic Prediction Project by Rob Palmer
 Therapeutic Claims Related to Regenerative Medicine Among U.S. Naturopathic Doctors by Melina Rodriguez
 Inoculating Minds Against the Infodemic by Creating Misinformation by Melanie Trecek-King

Gallery

See also 
 Skeptic's Toolbox
 Skepticon
 NECSS
 The Amaz!ng Meeting

References

Notes

External links

 
 
 Twitter: official announcements are made by @SkeptInquiry and @center4inquiry; hashtag #CSICon is in use
 All CFI events including CSICon – Lanyrd
 Skeptical Inquirer Presents

Conventions in the United States
Skeptic conferences
Recurring events established in 2011